Psammophylax rhombeatus (psammo=sand, phylax=guard) or Rhombic Skaapsteker, is a small, attractively patterned, Southern African snake usually measuring between 45 and 85 centimetres in length, though occasionally reaching 140 cm.

In colour it is greyish to yellowish brown or olive-brown, with 3-4 rows of dark, rhombus-shaped spots along its back, which may merge to form a zig-zag pattern. The colour and patterning may be quite variable. Its underside is yellowish-white, with the top of the head being uniform brownish.

It is found in the Western Cape, Kwazulu-Natal, Lesotho, Free State, Eswatini, and northwards through Northern Cape to Namibia and southern Angola in the west and to Limpopo province of South Africa in the east.

Occurring from sea level to mountain tops, it is a fast-moving diurnal snake and an active predator on small frogs, lizards and mammals. Its common name, meaning 'sheep stabber' or 'sheep stinger', is misleading as its small teeth are set so far back in the jaw and its neurotoxic venom is so mild, that it is incapable of killing any large animal. It has a gentle disposition, being reluctant to bite even when provoked.

The species falls between oviparous and ovoviviparous as it lays its eggs partly incubated. It lays up to 30 eggs of 20-35mm x 12-18mm, taking up to 6 weeks to hatch. Females are occasionally found coiled around their eggs in a protective attitude.

The Striped Skaapsteker (Psammophylax tritaeniatus) occurs throughout the same habitat and has similar habits.

References

Psammophiidae
Snakes of Africa
Reptiles described in 1758
Taxa named by Carl Linnaeus